Protective custody, was the extra- or para-legal rounding-up of political opponents, Jews and other persecuted groups of people in Nazi Germany. It was sometimes officially defended as being necessary to protect them from the 'righteous' wrath of the German population. Schutzhaft did not provide for a judicial warrant, in fact the detainee would most probably never have seen a judge. 

In providing for the detainment and "relocation" of those victims put under Schutzhaft, no documentation was provided. It was considered different from a normal judicial action, and did not require warrant or prior notice. 

The victims were then sent to concentration camps such as Dachau concentration camp or Buchenwald concentration camp.

References

Nazi terminology
Political repression in Nazi Germany